Dainik Agradoot (Assamese: দৈনিক অগ্ৰদূত) is an Assamese daily newspaper owned by Agradoot Publishers Pvt. Ltd. It published simultaneously from Guwahati, Jorhat and Tezpur. Dainik Agradoot has its headquarters at Dispur, Guwahati.

See also
List of Assamese periodicals

References

External links
 

Assamese-language newspapers
Year of establishment missing
Mass media in Guwahati